Petaluma Gap AVA is an American Viticultural Area established on January 8, 2018 by the U.S. Department of Treasury’s Alcohol and Tobacco Tax and Trade Bureau (TTB). The AVA lies entirely within the North Coast AVA and partially in the Sonoma Coast AVA with eighty commercially-producing vineyards cultivating  and nine bonded wineries. The wind gap in its coastal mountain range funnels cooling breezes and fog east from the Pacific Ocean through the city of Petaluma to San Pablo Bay. A persistent afternoon breeze causes lower grape yields and longer hang time contributes to the AVA vintages' unique flavors and fruit characteristics which defines their character and distinction.

Terroir
The distinguishing features of the Petaluma Gap are topography and climate. Its topography sets the AVA uniquely from Sonoma Coast AVA. These cycles contribute to a longer growing season benefiting cool-climate grape varieties. The lower elevations and rolling hills in Petaluma Gap allows the marine air to enter at a higher velocity than the surrounding regions where higher and steeper slopes disrupt the air flow. Although marine breezes are present during most of the day, the wind increases significantly in the afternoon hours because the rising inland hot air pulls the cooler, heavier marine layer from the coast causing a steady airflow. The effect of these prolonged high winds on the grapes is a reduction in photosynthesis to the extent that the grapes have to remain on the vine longer (hang time) in order to reach a given sugar level, compared to the same grape varietal grown in a less windy locations. Grapes grown in windy regions are typically smaller and have thicker skins than the same varietal grown elsewhere. According to the AVA's petition, the smaller grape size, thicker skins, and longer hang time concentrate the flavor compounds in the fruit, allowing grapes that are harvested at lower sugar levels to still have the typical flavor characteristics of the grape varietal. Also with the wind, there is no botrytis or mildew issues and the grapes have a higher skin-to-juice ratio.
The TTB modified the boundary of the North Coast AVA as described in Notice No. 163 because it determined the expansion area had the similar marine-influenced climate of the North Coast AVA. The Marin County portion of the Petaluma Gap remained outside of the Sonoma Coast AVA, while the Sonoma County portion remained within the Sonoma Coast AVA. TTB allowed the partial overlap to remain, primarily because the name “Sonoma Coast” is associated only with the coastal region of Sonoma County and does not extend into Marin County.

Wine Industry
TTB received the petition from Patrick L. Shabram, on behalf of the Petaluma Gap Winegrowers Alliance, proposing the establishment of the “Petaluma Gap” AVA and the boundary modifications to the multi-county North Coast AVA. Around 75 percent of plantings are Pinot Noir, with Chardonnay at 13 percent, and Syrah 12 percent.

References

External links
  Petaluma Gap - Wind to Wine by Petaluma Gap Winegrowers Alliance
  TTB AVA Map

American Viticultural Areas
Geography of Sonoma County, California
Geography of Marin County, California
American Viticultural Areas of California
California wine
2018 establishments in California